Mona McCluskey (also known as Meet Mona McCluskey) is an American sitcom that aired on NBC as part of its 1965-66 schedule. The series stars Juliet Prowse in the title role, and aired from September 16, 1965 to April 14, 1966.

Synopsis
Prowse portrayed Mona McCluskey, an actress who marries a United States Air Force sergeant, Mike McCluskey, played by Denny Scott Miller. The major premise of the show is Mona trying to balance her acting career with her marriage to Mike, who preferred that they live on his smaller Air Force salary.

The series also co-stars Herbert Rudley as General Crone, Mike's boss and Robert Strauss as Sergeant Gruzewsky. Series guest stars include Med Flory, Maurice Marsac, Lee Bergere, Sal Mineo, Barry Kelley, Doris Singleton, and Darlene Patterson.

Episodes

Production notes
The series was produced for NBC by McCadden Enterprises, Inc. in association with United Artists Television. The series executive producer was comedian George Burns.  The theme song was the Tin Pan Alley standard "Yes Sir, That's My Baby", sung by a male voice.

Reception
Mona McCluskey appeared on Thursday nights against ABC's Peyton Place and the second half-hour of CBS's two-hour Thursday Night Movie. It failed to win its time slot and was cancelled by NBC, with its last episode airing in April 1966.

External links 
 
 Mona McCluskey episode guide at The Classic TV Archive

1965 American television series debuts
1966 American television series endings
1960s American sitcoms
NBC original programming
English-language television shows
Military comedy television series
Television series by United Artists Television
Television series about actors
Television series about the United States Air Force